The  is a 4-laned toll road in Tokoname, Aichi, Japan. It is managed by Aichi Prefectural Road Public Corporation.

Overview

Officially the road is designated as Aichi Prefectural Route 522. The road is designated  (motor vehicles must have a displacement of at least 125 cc), and the design standard of the road is similar to national expressways.

Together with the Chitaōdan Road it is also referred to as the Centrair Line to indicate its status as the access road for Chubu Centrair International Airport.

Interchange list

 IC - interchange, JCT - junction

References

External links 

 Aichi Prefectural Road Public Corporation

Toll roads in Japan